The 2018 British Speedway Championship was the 58th edition of the British Speedway Championship. Craig Cook was the defending champion having won the title in 2017. The competition consisted of two semi-finals and a final, with eight riders qualifying from each semi-final. The championship was won by Robert Lambert for the first time, scoring a maximum in the final. Dan Bewley finished second in his first ever appearance, while Cook took third place.

Results

Semi-Final 1 
  Sheffield
 10 May 2018

Semi-Final 2 
  Leicester
 15 May 2018

The Final 
  National Speedway Stadium, Gorton
 11 June 2018

See also 
 British Speedway Championship

References 

British Speedway Championship
Great Britain
Speedway